Sujay Sunil Dahake (Marathi सुजय सुनील डहाके) is mainly known for his work as director and as editor for the film Shala, a film that was awarded  the Silver Lotus Award for Best Marathi Feature Film  at the 59th National Film Awards.

Career
The film Ajoba is his more ambitious movie than Marathi movie Shala.

Sujay has begun the scripting for his next project titled 'Shyam Chi Aai' which will be shot in black and white. The story is an adaptation of the famous autobiography Shyamchi Aai written by writer and social activist Sane Guruji. The autobiography reflected the strong depiction of a mother's love for her child.

Filmography

References

Marathi film directors
Living people
Marathi film editors
Year of birth missing (living people)